JPM may refer to:

People

 James Paul McCartney, English singer
 Jean-Baptiste Poquelin Molière, French playwright, actor and poet
Jean-Pierre Massiera, French musician
 Joannes Paulus Magnus ("John Paul the Great"), a Latin epithet applied to Pope John Paul II
 Johann Prokop Mayer, an Austrian naturalist and botanist. He created the flower gardens at the Würzburg Residence.
 John P. McLeod, an Australian writer and broadcaster.
 John Peter McArthur, a politician from Alberta, Canada
 John Pierpont "JP" Morgan, banker, lobbyist, founder of the eponymous financial institution
 John Piersol McCaskey, an American politician. He served as the 23rd mayor of Lancaster, Pennsylvania from 1907 to 1911
 Juan Pablo Montoya, Colombian racing car (Formula One, CART, NASCAR and others) driver 
 JPM (band), a Taiwanese Mandopop band
Fictional character
 Jacqueline Payne Marone, a character from the long-running U.S. daytime soap opera The Bold and the Beautiful

Places
 James Pennell Mansion, a mansion that stands in the Pennellville Historic District in Brunswick, Maine
 Jinhai Pulp Mill, the largest pulp mill in China, and the world's largest single-line pulp mill
 JPM Airport, a private airport located 2 miles west of Monmouth in Polk County, Oregon, USA

Other
 Jahan Pyar Mile, a 1970 Hindi film
 Jimi Plays Monterey, a posthumous live album by Jimi Hendrix released in February 1986
 Jin Ping Mei, a 1610 Chinese naturalistic novel composed in the vernacular (baihua) during the late Ming Dynasty
 Jingle Punks Music, a music licensing and production music company based in New York
 JPM, an Indonesian television network owned by Jawa Pos
 JPMorgan Chase, whose NYSE ticker symbol is JPM
 Les Avions Jean-Pierre Marie, a French aircraft design firm